Suleh (also Romanized as Sūleh, Sooleh, and Sowleh; also known as Soleh and Sūlelh) is a village in Khvor Khvoreh Rural District, Ziviyeh District, Saqqez County, Kurdistan Province, Iran. At the 2006 census, its population was 108, in 19 families. The village is populated by Kurds.

References 

Towns and villages in Saqqez County
Kurdish settlements in Kurdistan Province